Omar-Šarif Sijarić (born 2 November 2001) is a Montenegrin professional footballer who plays as a left winger for  club Erzgebirge Aue. He is a Montenegrin youth international.

Club career
Sijarić was born in Pfullendorf. After playing youth football with SC Pfullendorf and 1. FC Heidenheim, Sijarić joined Türkgücü München in August 2020. He made his debut for the club on 16 October 2020 as a substitute in a 2–0 defeat away to 1. FC Magdeburg, and scored the first goal of his career on 7 May 2021 with the opening goal of a 2–1 defeat to SC Verl. He scored once in 27 appearances across the 2020–21 season.

On 15 July 2021, Sijarić signed for 2. Bundesliga club Erzgebirge Aue on a three-year contract. He made his debut on 25 July 2021 in a 0–0 draw with 1. FC Nürnberg.

International career
He has played for Montenegro at under-19 and under-21 levels.

References

2001 births
Living people
People from Pfullendorf
German people of Montenegrin descent
Sportspeople from Tübingen (region)
Montenegrin footballers
German footballers
Footballers from Baden-Württemberg
Association football wingers
Montenegro youth international footballers
2. Bundesliga players
3. Liga players
Türkgücü München players
FC Erzgebirge Aue players